Going Spanish (1934) is an American short comedy film featuring the film debut of Bob Hope and directed by Al Christie.  The short comedy co-stars Leah Ray and Jules Epailly. Released by Educational Pictures, the film premiered on March 2, 1934.  It was re-cut and released as Bob's Busy Day by Comedy House in 1942.

Plot
While on vacation in an unnamed South American nation, Bob (Bob Hope) passes through the village of Los Pochos Eggos. His car collides with that of the mayor of the village. The mayor becomes enraged and he begins tearing Bob's car to pieces. Bob retaliates and takes his car apart as well.

According to the village tradition, on one day each year, any crime is forgiven provided that the criminal sing a song afterward. Bob could have been arrested, but instead he happened to appear in town on the appropriate day. Later in the film, Bob woos Senorita (Leah Ray) and begins to make the mayor jealous. Each time an offense is committed, the mayor declares "This means war."

Cast
 Bob Hope as Bob
 Leah Ray as Senorita
 Frances Halliday as Mother
 Jules Epailly as Mayor of Los Pochos Eggos
 Vicki Cummings as Bob's Girl
 William Edmunds as Gaucho
 Godoy's Argentine Band as Musical Ensemble

Reception
The film was unsuccessful and was panned by critics. Shortly after it was released, the bank robber John Dillinger was at large. Hope told Walter Winchell that he had starred in the film and then added "When they catch Dillinger, they're going to make him sit through it twice."

After Hope made this comment, Christie and Educational terminated Hope's contract. Hope then starred in his second and third short films, Soup for Nuts (Universal Studios, 9 July 1934) and Paree, Paree (Warner Brothers, 8 September 1934).

References

External links
 
 
 
 
 

1934 films
American musical comedy films
1934 musical comedy films
Educational Pictures short films
American black-and-white films
Films directed by Al Christie
Films set in South America
American comedy short films
1930s English-language films
1930s American films